Like That may refer to:

"Like That" (Doja Cat song), 2020
"Like That" (Eminem song) or "Ass Like That", 2005
"Like That" (Kris Wu song), 2018
"Like That" (Now United song), 2019
"Like That", a song by Bea Miller from Chapter Two: Red, 2017
"Like That", a song by Black Eyed Peas from Monkey Business, 2005
"Like That", a song by Chase & Status from Brand New Machine, 2013
"Like That", a song by Fleur East from Love, Sax and Flashbacks, 2015
"Like That", a song by JoJo from The High Road, 2006
"Like That", a song by Lil Durk from Love Songs 4 the Streets 2, 2019
"Like That", a song by Memphis Bleek from 534, 2005
"Like That", a song by Victoria Beckham from Victoria Beckham, 2001
"Like That", a song by Webbie from Savage Life, 2005
"Like That", a song by Yo Gotti from Untrapped, 2020